Axel Picazo (born April 5, 2001) is a professional footballer who plays as a midfielder for USL Championship club LA Galaxy II. Born in Mexico, he has previously represented the United States under-18 national team.

Career 
Picazo appeared as an amateur player for USL Championship side Bethlehem Steel during their 2019 season, as well as being part of the Philadelphia Union academy. In March 2020, Picazo joined LA Galaxy II.

References

External links 
 

2001 births
Living people
American soccer players
Association football midfielders
Philadelphia Union II players
LA Galaxy II players
Soccer players from Texas
USL Championship players
People from Round Rock, Texas
Footballers from Mexico City
Mexican footballers